Asma Shirazi is a senior Pakistani journalist who has received awards for her bravery and effort. She is a political commentator who hosts a primetime current-affairs show on Aaj News.

Early life and education
Born in Islamabad in 1976, Shirazi studied political science at Punjab University, she worked as a radio presenter with Radio Pakistan and later moved to Geo News in 2001. In 2006, Shirazi became Pakistan's first female war correspondent when she reported from the 2006 Lebanon War and later from Pakistan-Afghanistan border in 2009. Shirazi is a member of The Coalition For Women In Journalism.

She was born in Islamabad, and has a postgraduate degree in Political Science from Punjab University in Lahore.

Career
Shirazi began her career with PTV in 2000, moved to Geo News in 2002 and would go on to acquire a diverse variety of experience as a reporter and anchor with numerous channels. After working with Geo News, she joined ARY News in 2007 as an anchor and host of their current affairs program and later joined SAMAA TV in July 2010. She then hosted the widely acclaimed show, ‘Faisla Aap Ka’, with Dawn News. She was recognized for her comprehensive, unbiased and fair journalistic skills with the accolade of 'Best Current Affairs Anchor'. In 2014, she was again hosting 'Faisla Awam Ka' for Dawn News. Then she started hosting 'Faisla Aap Ka', though in a different format and from a different platform of Aaj News.

Shirazi has also reported from the front on numerous conflicts that include the 2006 Israel-Lebanon conflict, Taliban violence on the Pakistan-Afghanistan border in 2009 as well as the state of emergency announced by General Pervez Musharraf in Pakistan in 2007. She also covered the 2005 Kashmir earthquake.

Previously, she has worked at many Pakistani TV channels including Samaa TV (joined this TV channel in July 2010), GEO News and later on ARY News BOL News, Dawn News, Express News. She also hosted two popular television talk shows, including one on parliamentary affairs named Parliament Cafeteria that President Pervez Musharraf banned when he clamped down on independent news coverage. Shirazi joined BOL News on 24 October 2014 as Executive Vice President and Senior Anchorperson.

Peter Mackler Award
Shirazi is the first Pakistani journalist to win the prestigious Peter Mackler Award for Courageous and Ethical Journalism on 23 October 2014. The award is given annually to a single journalist who has demonstrated a great commitment to unbiased reporting and to upholding media freedoms. Shirazi's award pays "tribute to the courage of those who fight for freedom of information in Pakistan, where seven journalists were murdered in connection with their work in 2013," said Delphine Halgand, the Director of Reporters Without Borders. AFP has also recognized her momentous contribution. "AFP is happy to be associated with this recognition of Asma Shirazi's great courage and perseverance in reporting on conflict and politics in Pakistan despite the personal dangers she faced," said David Millikin, AFP's director for North America.

See also 
 Aaj News
 92 News

References 

Pakistani women journalists
Living people
Pakistani television talk show hosts
Punjabi people
People from Islamabad
University of the Punjab alumni
1976 births
Pakistani war correspondents
BOL Network people
Women television journalists
Peter Mackler Award for Courageous and Ethical Journalism